The New Hampshire Department of Education is the state education agency of the U.S. state of New Hampshire. It is headquartered in Concord. Frank Edelblut has led the department as commissioner since February 16, 2017.

History

New Hampshire has had a department of education since at least 1922.

Organization
The department "advances learner-centered opportunities that create bright futures."

In addition to a commissioner's office and deputy commissioner's office, the department consists of four divisions:
 Division of Learner Support
 Division of Educator and Analytic Resources
 Division of Educator Support and Higher Education
 Division of Workforce Innovation

Administratively attached to the department are:
 State Board of Education
 A seven-member body whose members are appointed by the governor and executive council
 Higher Education Commission
 A 17-member body (as of February 2022) which "regulates institutions of higher education in the state"
 Council for Teacher Education
 A seven-member body authorized by statute (RSA 190) to coordinate teacher education in the state
 Professional Standards Board
 A 21-member body authorized by statute (RSA 186:60) to advise the State Board of Education on matters related to the education profession

Notes

References

External links

Public education in New Hampshire
State departments of education of the United States
Education